The 1994 Memphis Tigers football team represented the University of Memphis in the 1994 NCAA Division I-A football season. The team was led by head coach Chuck Stobart.  The Tigers played their home games at the Liberty Bowl Memorial Stadium.

Schedule

References

Memphis
Memphis Tigers football seasons
Memphis Tigers football